Sphinx Ting or Ting Chun-cheng is a Taiwanese actor and male model. TV series and music videos. He has earned the title "fashion 4" (shortened to F4) due to his fashion experience with Godfrey Gao, Victor, and Gaby. They made a show for YKsuit in winter of 2008. In 2009, the four published a book meet fashion 4. He also has his own brand: "Doris Bella".

Ding was born in a rich family. His father Ding Sanguang owns a giant company. The first magazine he shot was CQ which fulfilled his childhood dreams.

Filmography

TV Series

Films

Music videos
S.H.E MV Can't Find It(找不到) (2004)
Gigi Leung MV The Love Song For Myself''''(给自己的情歌) (2006)
Joey Yung MV  Milk(牛奶) (2007)
A-Lin MV Before and After(以前以后) (2009)
Jam Hsiao MV How Can I Say Love (怎么说我不爱你) (2009)
Landy Wen MV Don't love me (2009)

TV Programs
2006/01/29 Mala PALACE       theme: date with actoress section B 　　
2006/06/21  Mala PALACE      theme: super hot male model2006/10/24  The Handsome Chief 
2006/10/26  The Handsome Chief2007/01/10  Mala PALACE      theme:  the superstar in rich family2008/02/01  Shen Chunhua lifeshow2008/05/07  Kang Xi is Coming    theme: My classmates are rich people2008/05/29  Three Pigs   theme:Let's make friends with Fashion 42008/06/10  Kang Xi is Coming theme:Fashion 42008/08/04  Make a Wish theme:let's have a summer holiday2008/09/04  As a College Studenttheme:We also have tough time2009/04/17  I Love Black Group2009/04/24  Helping Guo Guang2009/05/02  Guess!Guess!Guess! theme:Barbie2009/05/08  Challenge 1012009/05/12  Kang Xi is Coming    theme: Help us in Fellowship2009/10/14  Kang Xi is Coming    theme: MOMO LOVE2009/10/21  As a College Studenttheme:How to find true love2009/10/27  Awarding2009/10/29  Entertainment for 100%2009/12/05  Enjoy Your Weekendtheme:Bling Bling things2010/03/04  Kang Xi is Coming    theme: Speak out your love2010/03/05  Million of Class2010/10/20  SS Night of Yan sister''

References

1984 births
Taiwanese male models
Living people